This article lists the squads for the 2020 SheBelieves Cup, the 5th edition of the SheBelieves Cup. The cup consisted of a series of friendly games, and was held in the United States from 5 to 11 March 2020. The four national teams involved in the tournament registered a squad of 23 players.

The age listed for each player is on 5 March 2020, the first day of the tournament. The numbers of caps and goals listed for each player do not include any matches played after the start of tournament. The club listed is the club for which the player last played a competitive match prior to the tournament. The nationality for each club reflects the national association (not the league) to which the club is affiliated. A flag is included for coaches that are of a different nationality than their own national team.

Squads

England
Coach: Phil Neville

The final squad was announced on 18 February 2020. On 26 February 2020, Lucy Bronze withdrew due to calf injury and was replaced by Alessia Russo.

Japan
Coach: Asako Takakura

The squad was announced on 25 February 2020; Riko Ueki replaced Rikako Kobayashi due to injury on 1 March 2020.

Spain
Coach: Jorge Vilda

The final squad was announced on 24 February 2020. On 2 March 2020, Nahikari García was withdrawn due to a recurring foot injury and replaced with Alba Redondo.

United States
Coach:  Vlatko Andonovski

A 26-player preliminary squad was announced on 17 February 2020. The final squad was announced on 26 February 2020, with Jane Campbell, Jordan DiBiasi, and Margaret Purce not making the final squad.

Player representation

By club
Clubs with 3 or more players represented are listed.

By club nationality

By club federation

By representatives of domestic league

References

2020